Lone Tree Cemetery is a Commonwealth War Graves Commission (CWGC) burial ground for the dead of the First World War located in the Ypres Salient on the Western Front in Belgium. It is located at Spanbroekmolen, on one of the highest points of the Messines Ridge.

Foundation
Like the Spanbroekmolen cemetery nearby, Lone Tree Cemetery was established in 1917 at the start of the Battle of Messines. Most of the burials are of men from the Royal Irish Rifles 36th (Ulster) Division who died on the first day of the battle. Most graves are of soldiers who went "over the top" early in the morning of 7 June 1917. 

Some of the men buried here were actually killed by the explosion of the mine placed by the British Royal Engineers under Lone Tree hill at Spanbroekmolen, which was blown around 15 seconds later than planned. The Spanbroekmolen mine formed part of a series of mines under the German lines. The crater at Lone Tree was acquired in 1929 by the Toc H foundation in Poperinge, today recognised as the Pool of Peace memorial.

The cemetery was designed by J. R. Truelove. The cemetery grounds were assigned to the United Kingdom in perpetuity by King Albert I of Belgium in recognition of the sacrifices made by the British Empire in the defence and liberation of Belgium during the war.

References

External links
 
 Lone Tree Military Cemetery at Find a Grave

Commonwealth War Graves Commission cemeteries in Belgium
Heuvelland
Cemeteries and memorials in West Flanders
World War I cemeteries in Belgium